Giacomo della Porta (1532–1602) was an Italian architect and sculptor, who worked on many important buildings in Rome, including St. Peter's Basilica. He was born at Porlezza, Lombardy and died in Rome.

Biography
Giacomo Della Porta was born in the Duchy of Genoa into a family of sculptors. He was influenced by and collaborated with Michelangelo, and Giacomo Barozzi da Vignola, his teacher of architecture. With these two great masters he became one of the most important architects in the history of the Roman renaissance. In fact after 1563 he carried out Michelangelo's plans for the rebuilding of the Campidoglio or Capitoline Hill's open spaces where he completed the façade and steps of Palazzo Senatorio, and the Cordonata or the ramped steps up to the Piazza del Campidoglio.

After the death of Vignola in 1573, he continued the construction of Il Gesù, the mother church of the Jesuit order, and in 1584 modified its façade after his own designs.

He also worked on the construction of Palazzo Albertoni Spinola by acting on the load-bearing structures and internal partitions creating, through the orthogonality of the entrance gallery and the entrance hall of the Palace, a unique prospective visual effect.

From 1573 he was in charge of the ongoing construction of St. Peter's Basilica, and later, in collaboration with Domenico Fontana, completed Michelangelo's dome between 1588-1590.

It's important to underline that Della Porta and Fontana were not mere performers of Michelangelo's drawings; in fact, they had the merit of the technical execution of a firm that sanctioned an important stage of technological advances at the end of the sixteenth century. Not only did they make a noticeable change in the bend curvature of Michelangelo's projected design, making it closer to the Brunelleschi model, but inserted a series of chains in the masonry (especially in the upper part of the dome) to hold the transverse forces pushed by the vault they used high quality materials, hinging travertine plates with molten lead; features, which allowed the dome not to bear any serious damage after the earthquake of 1703. They also made the costumes with the help of sophisticated wooden finishes and drew the technical details of the 1: 1 scale dome directly on the floor of the Basilica of St. Paul outside the Walls.

Giacomo della Porta completed a number of Rome's fountains from the 16th century; these included the fountains in the Piazza del Popolo, the Fountain of Neptune, Rome and  La Fontana del Moro in the Piazza Navona and Fontana delle Tartarughe very important for the Roman legends.

He died suddenly in 1602 coming back to Rome from Frascati where he was building Villa Belvedere commissioned by the Aldobrandini family.

Selected works
St. Peter's Dome (1564)
Palazzetto Inside Palazzo Albertoni Spinola Perspective (1600)
Oratorio del SS. Crocifisso (1562-1568)
Chiesa del Gesù (1571-1575)
Fountains at the Palazzo Borghese (1573)
Fountains in Piazza Colonna (1574)
Small fountains at Piazza Navona (1574)
One fountain at the Piazza della Rotonda
Palazzo Senatorio at the Capitol Hill (1573-1602)
Palazzo della Sapienza (1578-1602)
Palazzo Capizucchi (1580)
Santa Maria dei Monti (1580)
Sant'Atanasio dei Greci (1581)
Façade of San Luigi dei Francesi (1589)
Fontana delle Tartarughe (1584)
Santa Maria Scala Coeli
Palazzo Marescotti (1585)
Palazzo Serlupi (1585)
SS. Trinità de' Monti (1586)
Fontana di Piazza alli Monti (1589)
Cupola of St. Peter's Basilica (1588–90)
Fountains at the Piazza di Santa Maria in Campitelli (1589)
Fontana di Piazza d'Aracoeli (1589)
Fontana della Terrina (1590)
Sculpture Christ delivering the keys of Heaven to St. Peter (1594), altar of the St. Peter chapel, church Santa Pudenziana
Palazzo Fani (1598)
San Paolo alle Tre Fontane (1599)
San Nicolò in Carcere (1599)
Palazzo Albertoni Spinola (1600)
Villa Aldobrandini (1600–02) in Frascati
Cappella Aldobrandini (1600–02) in Santa Maria sopra Minerva

References

Katherine Rinne, "Fluid Precision: Giacomo della Porta and the Acqua Vergine fountains of Rome", in Landscapes of Memory and Experience, ed. Jan Birksted (London, 2000), 183-201.
Katherine W. Rinne, "Between Precedent and Experiment: the Restoration of the Acqua Vergine (1560-1570)", in L. Roberts, S. Schaffer and P. Dear (eds.), The mindful hand: inquiry and invention from the late Renaissance to early industrialisation (Edita/University of Chicago Press: 2007), 95-115.

External links

Italian Mannerist architects
Italian Mannerist sculptors
1530s births
1602 deaths
Architects from Genoa
16th-century Italian architects
16th-century Italian sculptors